Billingsville is an unincorporated community in Cooper County, in the U.S. state of Missouri.

History
Billingsville was laid out in 1860. The Billingsville post office closed in 1942.

References

Unincorporated communities in Cooper County, Missouri
Unincorporated communities in Missouri